Andrea Demetriades (born 1983) is an Australian actress known for her television, theatre and film roles.

Personal life
Demetriades was born in Perth, the youngest of four sisters. Her father, Costas, emigrated from Cyprus in 1969 and met her mother, Athena. Athena was born in Perth, and her father was from Andros, Greece. Athena was an artist and Costas became a Greek language teacher and a translator, helping people with legal matters and translating in hospitals and welfare departments.

Demetriades studied Dance at the Western Australian Academy of Performing Arts, and Communications and Cultural Studies at Curtin University. She graduated from the National Institute of Dramatic Art (NIDA) with a Bachelor of Dramatic Art (Acting) degree in 2006.

Television
Demetriades is best known for her role as Lina Badir in the television series Crownies. She reprised the role for the spin-off series Janet King in 2014 and 2016. Her television guest roles include All Saints as Felicity Summers in 2009, Mr & Mrs Murder as Lola and Miss Fisher's Murder Mysteries as Beatrice in 2013. Demetriades appeared in the critically acclaimed 2015 Australian drama series The Principal as Hafa Habeb.  In 2017 she starred in both the Australian Broadcasting Corporation's TV series Seven Types of Ambiguity, and Pulse as Doctor Lou Tannis. In 2018 she also starred in the Australian Broadcasting Corporation's TV series Squinters.

Theatre
Demetriades has featured in the films Nerve and Around The Block. Her theatre roles include Bell Shakespeare's Pericles, for which she was nominated for a 2009 Green Room Award and she toured Australia in Bell Shakespeare's Twelfth Night in 2010. She starred as Eliza Doolittle in Sydney Theatre Company's 2012 production of Pygmalion.

Film

Demetriades is one of the main protagonists in the 2015 film Alex & Eve about dating between a Greek (Alex, played by Richard Brancatisano) and a Muslim Lebanese (Eve, played by Demetriades).

References

Further reading
 Andrea Demetriades feeling right at home in STC's Perplex. The Daily Telegraph.
 Andrea Demetriades on a Shaw thing for return to STC main stage. The Daily Telegraph.
 At home with actress Andrea Demetriades. The Daily Telegraph.

External links

1983 births
Australian film actresses
Australian people of Greek Cypriot descent
Australian people of Greek descent
Australian stage actresses
Australian television actresses
Living people
National Institute of Dramatic Art alumni
Actors from Perth, Western Australia